Tolkien Black aka Token Black, formerly known as Token Williams, is a fictional character in the adult animated television series South Park. He was originally voiced by Trey Parker, later changed to series art director, storyboard artist and producer Adrien Beard. Originally the character was named "Token Williams" and then "Token Black", as a play on Tokenism. His name was retconned in the episode "The Big Fix" to Tolkien, named after J. R. R. Tolkien.

Biography
Tolkien attends South Park Elementary, he is a third-then fourth-grade student of Mr. Garrison's class, who was replaced by Mrs. Nelson in season 19. He was originally the only African American student attending the school until Nichole Daniels was introduced in "Cartman Finds Love". Residing in South Park, he is the only child of Linda and Steve Black, who were originally the only African American family in the town until the Daniels family first appeared. As such, his name is a pun on the concept of racial tokenism in fiction. Tolkien is a member of a four-part group that works against the main four characters (Stan, Kyle, Cartman and Kenny) in multiple plotlines, which consists of him, Craig Tucker, Clyde Donovan and Jimmy Valmer.

Character

Creation and design
Tolkien debuted in the series' first episode, "Cartman Gets an Anal Probe", though having no spoken line. He was composed with construction paper and animated through stop motion. From "Weight Gain 4000" onward he is animated with computers, though is rendered to mimic that of the construction paper used in the first episode. Tolkien is not offered the same free-ranged motion as hand-drawn characters, as he is shown on one angle, and is animated with a jerky fashion.

Tolkien is African-American, with dark brown skin and short black hair, and usually wears a light purple long sleeve shirt with a yellow letter "T" on it, and dark blue jeans. Adrien Beard speaks with his normal vocal range and is edited with Pro Tools, which alters the pitch to that of a fourth grader.

Following the release of "The Big Fix", Tolkien's name was edited in all previously-released material to match the retcon, including subtitles of past episodes. Because "The Big Fix" establishes that Stan and Randy have been unaware of Tolkien's real name up until this point, Tolkien's name is still subtitled as "Token" in their dialogue.

Personality and traits
Tolkien is known for being rational and intelligent. He is also known for standing up for himself and his rights, such as in "With Apologies to Jesse Jackson", where he was upset by Randy Marsh saying the n-word on Wheel of Fortune, in which he did not forgive Stan until later in the episode, as well as in "Christian Rock Hard" where he was annoyed with Eric Cartman, where he was fed up with him, and physically assaulted him in front of many Christian fans.

In "Christian Rock Hard" he is shown to be skilled at bass guitar, despite never having learned to play it, a confirmation that comes, much to his annoyance, of the Black stereotype promulgated by Cartman that any black person can play the bass. He is also shown to be a talented singer in the episodes "Wing" and "Here Comes the Neighborhood".

Reception
Paste magazine ranked him at No. 17 on a list entitled "The Top 20 Best South Park Characters". He was ranked at No. 19 by Looper on a list entitled "25 Popular South Park Characters Ranked Worst to Best".

References

External links 
 Tolkien Black at South Park Studios

South Park characters
Black characters in animation
Child characters in television
Television characters introduced in 1997
Fictional African-American people
Fictional characters from Colorado
Fictional elementary school students
Male characters in animated series
Things named after Tolkien works
Animated characters introduced in 1997